Tufin is a security policy management company specializing in the automation of security policy changes across hybrid platforms while improving security and compliance. The Tufin Orchestration Suite supports next-generation firewalls, network layer firewalls, routers, network switches, load balancers, web proxies, private and public cloud platforms and microservices.

On August 25, 2022, Turn/River Capital completed the acquisition of Tuffin.

History
Prior to its 2019 initial public offering, Tufin was privately funded since its establishment.

On April 6, 2022 Tufin announced that it had entered into a definitive agreement to be acquired by software-focused investment firm, Turn/River Capital. The agreement valued the company at $570 Million, and was an all-cash deal. Since the closing of the transaction, Tufin is a private company.

Products
Tufin develops and markets the Tufin Orchestration Suite which consists of:
 SecureTrack:  Firewall Operations Management, Auditing and Compliance
 SecureChange: Security Change Automation
 SecureApp: Application Connectivity Management
 SecureCloud: Hybrid Cloud Security

The company releases updates to Tufin Orchestration Suite each quarter.

The Suite is designed for large enterprises along with managed security service providers (MSSP) and IT security auditors. Tufin products help security teams to implement and maintain their security policy on all of their firewalls, routers and network switches. They accelerate service delivery through network change automation and expedite the process of compliance audits for security standards such as PCI DSS, NERC and Sarbanes Oxley. Tufin products also help companies to manage and automate the daily configuration changes to network security devices.

Innovation
Tufin's innovation includes several technologies such as the Automatic Policy Generator which refines security rules based on network traffic, methods for automating security policy management and the concept of managing network security policies from an application scope. Tufin's core technology is protected by multiple US patents.

Partnerships
Other network security vendors provide operations management, auditing and change automation for Tufin products. Tufin technology partners include Check Point, Cisco, Fortinet, Juniper Networks, McAfee, Palo Alto Networks, Stonesoft, F5 Networks, VMware, Zscaler, Amazon Web Services (AWS), Microsoft Azure, BMC, ServiceNow, Puppet Labs and others.

References

External links
 Application Connectivity Management - "Tufin's SecureApp Completes Trifecta Of Security Policy Management" by Alan Shimel
 Rethinking Firewall Management - ZDNet article by Tom Foremski
 SIX deploys Tufin - How the Swiss Stock Exchange uses Tufin to manage firewalls and applications
 2013 Survey of 500 C-level managers and senior IT professionals
 Official company web site
 "Network Security Policy Management Solutions Have Evolved" - a research paper by Gartner
 "Tufin Collaborates with Microsoft to Integrate Public Cloud Support with Microsoft Azure into the Tufin Orchestration Suite™"

2019 initial public offerings
companies based in Boston
companies listed on the New York Stock Exchange
computer security companies
computer security software companies
software companies established in 2005
software companies of the United States
2022 mergers and acquisitions